This is a list of the appearance leaders in men's rugby union test matches, listing the 79 players with over one hundred test caps. Rugby union requires only one nation to recognise a match as a test in order for it to be included in test statistics for that nation. The British and Irish Lions and Pacific Islanders do not represent a single country, but they are selected by a group of national unions and are recognised as test teams. Some national teams have sometimes granted test caps for matches against teams such as the invitational Barbarians side; these are included only if the union granted test caps for a particular match.

List

Notes

See also
 List of leading rugby union test try scorers
 List of leading rugby union test point scorers
 List of leading international rugby union drop goal scorers
 International rugby union player records

References

External links
Scrum.com

Caps
Caps